Lester Everett Lyles (born December 27, 1962) is a former professional American football cornerback/strong safety in the National Football League. He played six seasons for the New York Jets, the Phoenix Cardinals, and the San Diego Chargers.

Family
Lyle's son, Jairus Lyles, is a member of the Utah Jazz.

References

External links
 Bio from the 1987 Jets yearbook

1962 births
Living people
Players of American football from Washington, D.C.
American football safeties
American football cornerbacks
New York Jets players
Phoenix Cardinals players
San Diego Chargers players
Virginia Cavaliers football players